The West Christmas Ever is the third extended play (EP) by American drag performer Nina West, which was released by Producer Entertainment Group on November 8, 2019. The Christmas EP has five original songs and three interludes featuring Jim Cummings; The Vox Ensemble of the Columbus Gay Men's Chorus are featured on "Santa Will Be Gone". "Jingle Juice" has a music video. The EP peaked at number five on Billboard Comedy Albums chart, and had a generally-positive reception.

Development

Nina West (Andrew Levitt's drag persona) began work on the project in July 2019. She completed five songs, which she described as "very different" and representative of "all of these different parts of Andrew and Nina respectively, and my sensibilities around the holidays, both in and out of drag".

She met American voice actor and singer Jim Cummings in August, at a D23 event through Cummings' ex-wife and daughter, who are fans of RuPaul's Drag Race, the American reality television series in which Nina West competed (season 11). Needing someone to voice Santa Claus and tie the songs together, West recruited Cummings. In a Billboard interview, she recalled that he agreed to participate "without batting a lash". West described herself as a "lifelong Disney fan" who was "hyper aware of Jim for a long time": "His voice is synonymous with so many Disney characters that you likely are a fan of his without knowing it". She said about working with him:

Composition
The EP includes five original songs and three "whimsical" interludes with Cummings ("Santa's Not So Little Helper", "Nina the Extra Elf", and "The West Christmas Ever"). Billboard Stehen Daw wrote, "The new project sees the star tackling all the genres she can, from country-rock to classic choral Christmas, all while playing up her character as Nina the Elf, and not-so-helpful helper of Santa Claus." "Jingle Juice" was described as a "honky-honk holiday hoedown" by Hollywood Life's Jason Brow. West said that the song was her favorite to sing and record for the EP, and described "Jingle Juice" as having a "rockabilly, Chris Stapleton, stomp-clap, Christmas at a saloon in the North Pole kind of vibe". She said about the song: 

"Christmas Arrow" commemorates one of West's favorite singers. In "Cha Cha Heels", she declares John Waters Female Trouble (1974) a Christmas film; West said that the song allows her to connect with her appreciation for Broadway theatre, "like it's a weird extension of Hairspray". In "It's Chris, Miss", she asks Santa Claus for some Hollywood "hunks" under her Christmas tree. West described the song as "ridiculousness" and "really really fun ... because lyrically, it is just so dumb". "Santa Will Be Gone" features the Vox Ensemble of the Columbus Gay Men's Chorus.

Release and promotion

The West Christmas Ever was released by Producer Entertainment Group on November 8, 2019, following her previous EPs Drag Is Magic and John Goodman (both released on the same label on May 17, 2019). "Jingle Juice" music video sees West bring the holiday spirit to people "stuck without really celebrating the seasons". She said that the video has "a mix of the Wild West themes" and was influenced by Dolly Parton, Hee Haw and Lady Bunny, one of her favorite entertainers. The video also refers to National Lampoon's Christmas Vacation (1989). According to West, "the idea of going to a town where it was kind of isolated and stuck in a certain time" was an inspiration for the video. To commemorate West being named National Volunteer Fundraiser of the Year, her foundation launched "The West Christmas Ever — 25 days of Christmas" to present $1,000 grants to LGBT+ organizations across the U.S. every day from December 1 to December 25.

Reception
Randy Shulman of Metro Weekly called the collection "as festive and funny as you'd hope", and Decider.com's Brett White said that the EP "is sure to spice up your holiday plans with a bit of that Nina West magic, which is kind of a mix of cinnamon and a warm hug". Jason Brow wrote for Hollywood Life, "Nina gives Santa Claus a run for his money when it comes to spreading the holiday spirit ... her trademark humor is ever-present ...[which]... reminds us that we need to carry this moment of 'peace on earth, goodwill to all' beyond December". According to Brow, "Jingle Juice" "will put the rocking back in your stocking", described its music video as "joyous", and called "It's Chris, Miss" "hilarious". The EP peaked at number five on Billboard Comedy Albums chart.

Track listing
Track listing adapted from AllMusic and the Apple Store

Charts

References

External links
 

2019 EPs
Christmas EPs
Comedy albums by American artists
Nina West albums
Producer Entertainment Group albums